Harvey Birdman: Attorney General is a 2018 animated American television special written by Michael Ouweleen and Erik Richter, and directed by Richard Ferguson-Hull. Harvey Birdman: Attorney General is a continuation of the animated television series Harvey Birdman, Attorney at Law, created by Ouweleen and Richter, that originally aired on Adult Swim from 2001 to 2007. The special was originally released on the Adult Swim website on October 12, 2018, before making its official television debut on October 15, 2018, at 12:00 midnight. In the special Harvey Birdman is appointed assistant-U.S. attorney general and attempts to have now-President Phil Ken Sebben impeached.

The special took a year to produce. It features the same cast members from the original series reprising their respective roles. It has received generally positive reviews from critics.

Plot

Phil Ken Sebben awakes to find that he is now the President of the United States, without having any memory of being elected. He goes on to appoint Harvey Birdman, his ghostwriter for various books, as Attorney General to help him be removed from office.

Voice cast

 Gary Cole as Harvey Birdman
 Stephen Colbert as Phil Ken Sebben and Myron Reducto
 Chris Edgerly as Peter Potamus
 Paget Brewster as Judy Ken Sebben/Birdgirl
 Thomas Allen as Peanut
 Grey Griffin as "Deirdre"
 John Michael Higgins as Mentok the Mindtaker
 Peter MacNicol as X the Eliminator
 Toby Huss as Ernie Devlin
 Phil LaMarr as Black Vulcan
 Ferdinand Jay Smith as the narrator

Production and background
Harvey Birdman: Attorney General is a continuation of the animated television series Harvey Birdman, Attorney at Law, which was created by Michael Ouweleen and Erik Richter. In the original series Harvey Birdman served as an attorney for various Hanna-Barbera characters. The pilot episode aired on Cartoon Network on December 30, 2000. The series later made its official debut on Adult Swim on September 2, 2001, and ended on July 22, 2007, with a total of 39 episodes over the course of 4 seasons.

Adult Swim president Mike Lazzo offered Ouweleen the opportunity to make a new special during a casual phone call. Ouweleen was given the idea for the concept when his boss, Christina Miller, simply approached him with the soon-be title "Harvey Birdman... Attorney General". The animation was done by Awesome Inc., an animation company located in Atlanta. Several key animators from the original series were also involved. The special was live streamed and posted to the Adult Swim website on October 12, 2018, and later made its official television debut on Adult Swim on October 15, 2018.

It was written by Ouweleen and Richter, and directed by Richard Ferguson-Hull, who directed most episodes of the original series. The plot  of the special serves as a loose parallel to Donald Trump, and his administration as President of the United States. The special focuses more-so on the main characters, as opposed to the original series where episodes would generally focus on classic Hanna-Barbera characters. Richter said this was in-part because they loved the core cast and didn't feel they needed many Hanna-Barbera characters. Several Hanna-Barbera characters do make background cameos throughout the special, a common element of the original series.

The primary cast members from the original series returned to reprise their respective roles in Harvey Birdman: Attorney General. The cast was reportedly very enthused about the project and were able to jump back into character immediately. The voice recording process took a single day to complete. Ouweleen explicitly noted that Stephen Colbert was considerably invested into the project right away, with Richter stating that he "didn’t do it for the money".

Reception
The original American television airing of Harvey Birdman: Attorney General on October 15, 2018 was watched by 566,000 viewers and received a 0.3 share in the 18-49 demographic.

William Hughes of The A.V. Club gave the special a grade of an "A−". Hughes praised the voice cast, calling them "remarkable", for their respective performances being on-par with their performances in the original series. He praised the entire special as a follow up to the original series saying "It’s striking how much of the special feels like the show is picking up right where it left off back in 2007". The A.V. Club also ranked the special 2nd on their list of recommended television programming for the night of October 14–15, 2018, behind The Deuce.

Dave Trumbore of Collider gave the special 3 stars, which is classified as "Good". Trumbore stated "There’s plenty of fun to be found whether you’re a new or returning fan of Harvey Birdman".

References

External links

 

Harvey Birdman, Attorney at Law
2018 television specials
2010s animated television specials
2010s American television specials
Adult Swim pilots and specials
Fiction about memory erasure and alteration
Parodies of Donald Trump
Maine in fiction
Ghostwriting in fiction
Termination of employment in popular culture
Fiction about resurrection
White House in fiction
Works about writers